Dicomes (1st century BC) was a Getian king.

References

Dacian kings
1st-century BC rulers in Europe